"Pop Master" is the 24th single by Japanese singer and voice actress Nana Mizuki, released on April 13, 2011, together with her 23rd single, "Scarlet Knight".

Track listing 
 "Pop Master"
Lyrics, composition: Nana Mizuki
Arrangement: Hitoshi Fujima (Elements Garden)
Cheering song for NTV's 31st High School Quiz
Theme song for mobile game Idol o Tsukuro
 "Unbreakable"
Lyrics: Shoko Fujibayashi
Composition: Shunryuu
Arrangement: Jun Suyama
Opening theme for Nintendo 3DS and Sony PlayStation Portable game UnchainBlades Rexx

Trivia
It was a homage to CNN graphics, entitled Mizuki Nana News Network or MNN.

Charts

Oricon Sales Chart (Japan)

References

2011 singles
Nana Mizuki songs
Songs written by Nana Mizuki